Lost on the River: The New Basement Tapes is an album produced by T Bone Burnett featuring a collective of musicians recording under the moniker The New Basement Tapes—Elvis Costello, Rhiannon Giddens, Taylor Goldsmith, Jim James and Marcus Mumford.

The album consists of a series of tracks based on recently uncovered lyrics handwritten by Bob Dylan in 1967; these were probably written in the period between his motorcycle accident (July 29, 1966) and the first recordings in the spring of 1967 in the "Red Room" in Dylan's house, where the first recordings of The Basement Tapes took place. The album was released November 11, 2014 in both a standard 15-track release and a "Deluxe Version" featuring 20 tracks.

The album cover image is a photograph by Jacob Riis titled "Mullen's Alley". It was taken in New York City in 1888.

Background

In early May 1967, Dylan told reporter Michael Iachetta: "Songs are in my head like they always are, but they are not going to get written down until some people come forth and make up for some of the things that had happened", probably referring to his conflict with his manager Albert Grossman. During the period in which he started recording with The Hawks, Dylan changed his writing habits and wrote his text directly on a typewriter.

Dylan's publisher contacted Burnett regarding the box of handwritten lyrics that had been found, dating back to Dylan's Basement Tapes days, and asked if he had any interest in doing something with them. As soon as Burnett was assured that Dylan was on board with the project, he agreed to it. Burnett selected his band based on their talent and collaborative style, as well as their interest as "musical archaeologists". Each member of the group was sent the collection of lyrics, and each arrived at the recording session with a selection of tunes, some having set only some of the lyrics, others having set all of them. Not wishing to encourage competition, the group decided to record all the tunes, including multiple settings of the same lyrics. Of the resulting 40 tracks, 20 are included on the present album.

Actor Johnny Depp played guitar on "Kansas City", filling in for Elvis Costello, who could not attend one of the recording sessions due to a previously scheduled concert with The Roots in Las Vegas. Depp also joined the band onstage, along with Haim, for one of their only live performances at the Ricardo Montalban Theater in Los Angeles.

Reception

In a Los Angeles Times article in 2014, writer Randy Lewis wrote,
The album aims to honor the freewheeling musical spirit and collaborative creative process of the original sessions. One intriguing facet is the collaboration among the participants. Each has come up with his or her own music for many of the lyrics, resulting in multiple versions of the same songs and allowing a perspective on the ways different artists respond to Dylan's lyrics.

A review in The Guardian stated, Lost on the River recalls the spontaneity and sheer love of music-making of the original, but it’s not hamstrung by reverence or caution.

In Uncut, Graeme Thomson wrote, Lost On The River is an album of good, sometimes excellent songs with a unique creation story which, in the end, adds little of substance to the narrative of perhaps the most mythologised recordings in history. As footnotes go, however, it’s an entertaining, energised and often fascinating one. 

Writing for MXDWN, Elliot Greiner said, Fulfilling the marketable promise that supergroups bring, Burnett’s ensemble infuses great musicianship into the project, however a disconnect remains; Lost is an album of Dylan songs that sounds like an album of anything but.

The critical aggregator website Metacritic awarded Lost on the River a score of 75 indicating "generally favorable reviews", based on the published reviews of 18 critics.

Bob Dylan's original Basement Tapes

Among Bob Dylan’s cultural milestones, the Basement Tapes – around 100 songs written and recorded by Dylan in 1967, backed by members of his touring ensemble who would later achieve their own fame as The Band – have fascinated successive generations of musicians, fans and cultural critics. Having transformed music and culture during the preceding five years, Dylan had achieved great fame by the mid-1960s through the release of three historic albums, the single, "Like a Rolling Stone", a controversial "electric" performance at the Newport Folk Festival and tours of the United States, Australia and Europe which polarized his audience. Dylan's large body of work in that decade was interrupted in July 1966 when it was reported that he had been badly injured in a motorcycle accident in upstate New York.

Recovering from his injuries and away from the public eye, Dylan ensconced himself, along with Robbie Robertson, Rick Danko, Richard Manuel, Garth Hudson and, later, Levon Helm, in the basement of a small house in West Saugerties, New York – dubbed "Big Pink" by the group. This collective recorded more than a hundred songs over the next several months – traditional covers, wry and humorous ditties, off-the cuff performances and dozens of newly-written Bob Dylan songs, including "I Shall Be Released", "The Mighty Quinn", "Tears of Rage", and "You Ain't Goin' Nowhere".

When rumors and acetates of some basement recordings began to surface, the album Great White Wonder appeared in a few record shops in 1969 as one of the first bootleg records. Dylan's original recordings remained commercially unavailable until 1975, when Columbia Records released 16 of Dylan's songs on The Basement Tapes album.

Videos
As of October 26, 2014, five lyric videos had been released for tracks from the album, each of them featuring Bob Dylan's actual handwritten lyrics inhabiting an animated environment:
"Nothing to It", with lead vocal by Jim James, The New Basement Tapes - Nothing To It - Lyrics by Bob Dylan & Lead Vocals by Jim James on August 19, 2014.
"Married to My Hack", with lead vocal by Elvis Costello, Married To My Hack - Lyrics by Bob Dylan & Lead Vocals by Elvis Costello on September 2, 2014.
"When I Get My Hands on You", with lead vocal by Marcus Mumford, When I Get My Hands On You - Lyrics by Bob Dylan & Vocals by Marcus Mumford on September 23, 2014.
"Spanish Mary", with lead vocal by Rhiannon Giddens, Spanish Mary - Lyrics by Bob Dylan & Lead Vocals by Rhiannon Giddens on October 14, 2014.
"Liberty Street", with lead vocal by Taylor Goldsmith, Liberty Street - Lyrics by Bob Dylan & Lead Vocals by Taylor Goldsmith on October 26, 2014.

Track listing
The 20-track "Deluxe Version" listed below includes five additional songs not found on the standard issue, "Golden Tom – Silver Judas", "Quick Like a Flash", "Hidee Hidee Ho #16", "Diamond Ring", and "The Whistle Is Blowing".

Personnel
 Elvis Costello – vocals (1,2,6,7,10,12,14,15,16,18,19), acoustic guitar (10,16), 12-string acoustic guitar (7), electric guitar (1,2,4,12,19), electric tenor guitar (9), slide guitar (11), electric mandocaster (18), ukulele (14), bass (5,6,17), organ (8,13,15), Mellotron (3)
 Rhiannon Giddens – vocals (2,4,6,9,11,12,14,16,19,20), banjo (9), minstrel banjo (4), fiddle (5,8,10,11,12,13,14,15)
 Taylor Goldsmith – vocals (1,3,5,7,9,10,13,14,15,16,17,18,19), acoustic guitar (7,10,11,14,16,17,20), electric guitar (8,13,18), baritone guitar (3), bass (1,2,4,14,15), piano (3,5,6,18,19), organ (10,18), Mellotron (9,12)
 Jim James – vocals (1,3,6,7,8,9,10,11,14,15,16,17,18,19), acoustic guitar (7), electric guitar (1,3,4,5,6,10,15), bass (8,9,12,13,16,18,19), organ (1,14,17), Mellotron (2,4,5,11), synthesizer (6), OP-1 (17)
 Marcus Mumford – vocals (1,3,6,7,8,9,10,13,14,15,16,17,18,19), acoustic guitar (3,18,19,20), electric guitar (6,8,9,13,17), mandolin (1,3,10,11,12,14,16), drums (1,2,4,5,15), brushes (7)
 Jay Bellerose – drums (1,2,3,4,5,6,8,9,11,12,13,14,15,16,17,18,19), percussion (8,17), tambourine (13)
 T Bone Burnett – electric guitar (2)
 Zach Dawes – bass (3,11)
 Johnny Depp – electric guitar (3)
 Griffin Goldsmith – drums (3,11,13)
 Alana Haim – backing vocals (3,18)
 Danielle Haim – backing vocals (3,18)
 Este Haim – backing vocals (3,18)
 Binki Shapiro – backing vocals (3,18)
 S.I. Istwa – backing vocals (5,11,20)
 Jessica Kiley – backing vocals (5,11,20)
 Megan Lovell – backing vocals (5,11,19,20)
 Rebecca Lovell – mandolin (20), backing vocals (5,11,19,20)
 Carla Azar – drums (6,9,12,19)
 Bo Koster – piano (11)

Charts

Weekly charts

Year-end charts

See also
New Multitudes a similar project using Woody Guthrie lyrics also featuring Jim James.
Out Among the Stars, a 2014 Johnny Cash album composed of abandoned sessions which also features Elvis Costello
Forever Words, a 2018 album of Cash lyrics finished by several musicians, including Burnett and Costello
List of songs written by Bob Dylan
List of artists who have covered Bob Dylan songs

References

2014 debut albums
Elvis Costello albums
Jim James albums
Harvest Records albums
Collaborative albums
Blues rock albums by American artists
Folk rock albums by American artists
Country rock albums by American artists
Albums produced by T Bone Burnett
Self-released albums
Psychedelic rock albums by American artists
Bob Dylan tribute albums
Albums recorded at Capitol Studios